Droz is a surname:

 Joseph Droz (1773–1850), a French writer on ethics, political science and political economy
 Numa Droz (27 January 1844 – 15 December 1899), a Swiss politician 
 Pierre Jaquet-Droz (1721–1790), a Swiss-born watchmaker of the late eighteenth century, also working in Paris and London
 Jaquet-Droz automata, the doll automata co-built by Jaquet-Droz
 Daniela Droz (born 1977), a Puerto Rican actress, singer, and television host in Spanish-language media
 Antoine Gustave Droz (1832–1895), French man of letters, son of the French sculptor Jules-Antoine Droz (1807–1872)
 Jules Humbert-Droz (1891–1971), a Swiss Communist
 Droz (wrestler) (born 1969), former World Wrestling Federation (WWF, now WWE) wrestler and NFL player

See also
 Mehmet Oz (born 1960), Turkish surgeon, author and television personality known as Dr Oz

Franco-Provençal-language surnames